xUnit.net is a free and open-source unit testing tool for the .NET Framework, written by the original author of NUnit. The software can also be used with .NET Core and  Mono.

It is licensed under Apache License 2.0, and the source code is available on GitHub. xUnit.net works with Xamarin, ReSharper, CodeRush, and TestDriven.NET. It is authored by James Newkirk and Brad Wilson.

Example 
Example of an xUnit.net test fixture:

using Xunit;

public class MyTests
{
    [Fact]
    public void MyTest()
    {
        Assert.Equal(4, 2 + 2);
    }
}

After you compile the test, run it in your console:

C:\MyTests\bin\Debug> xunit.console MyTestLibrary.dll
xUnit.net console test runner (64-bit .NET 2.0.50727.0)
Copyright (C) 2007-11 Microsoft Corporation.

xunit.dll:     Version 1.9.1.0
Test assembly: C:\MyTests\bin\Debug\MyTestLibrary.dll

1 total, 0 failed, 0 skipped, took 0.302 seconds

See also 

 Test automation
 List of unit testing frameworks for .NET programming languages (includes column indicating which are based on xUnit)
 JUnit

References

Further reading

External links 

Unit Testing: xUnit | Visual Studio Toolbox | Channel 9

Extreme programming
Unit testing frameworks
Free software programmed in C Sharp
Microsoft free software
Software that uses Mono (software)
Software using the Apache license